Stephen Mandel  (born July 18, 1945) is a Canadian politician and leader of the Alberta Party from 2018 to 2019. He previously served as an Alberta cabinet minister from 2014 to 2015 and as mayor of Edmonton, Alberta for three terms from 2004 to 2013. Prior to being mayor, he was a councillor for three years.

On September 15, 2014, he was made Minister of Health by premier Jim Prentice, despite not holding a seat in the Legislative Assembly of Alberta. He was subsequently named as the Alberta Progressive Conservative Party's candidate in a by-election in Edmonton-Whitemud, the seat formerly held by Dave Hancock, which was scheduled for October 27, 2014. He won in the byelection but was subsequently defeated in the general election on May 5, 2015.

Mandel announced his candidacy for the leadership of the Alberta Party on January 10, 2018. He was elected on February 27, 2018, defeating two other candidates.  Mandel resigned as Alberta Party leader in June, 2019.

Background
Mandel received an associate of arts degree from Lincoln College in Lincoln, Illinois, a bachelor of science in business administration from Miami University, and his masters in political science from the University of Windsor.

He moved to Edmonton in 1972 from Windsor, Ontario.

Mandel owns the Strathcona County’s Lakeland Village mobile home park.

Mandel was active with promoting the city's arts and festival scene. He is also an active volunteer with the city's local Heart and Stroke Foundation and with several local Jewish organizations.

Entry into politics
Prior to being elected to city council, Mandel ran unsuccessfully for school trustee He was first elected to the Edmonton City Council in 2001 as a councillor for Ward 1. In 2004, he became mayor by defeating Edmonton's three-term mayor, Bill Smith. Mandel credits his successes to the hard work and spirit of cooperation of his council. Mandel left office as Mayor of Edmonton on October 29, 2013.

Mayor of Edmonton

Public Works
Mandel's city council was responsible for many infrastructural achievements: expansion of the LRT lines, the construction of a new arena for the Edmonton Oilers.

After years of public consultations since 2008, the city approved a plan gradually decommission the City Centre airport by implementing the City Centre Redevelopment Plan. The City Centre Redevelopment Plan aims to mitigate urban sprawl by redeveloping the aging and costly City Centre Airport  into a sustainable-300 acre inner city neighbourhood anticipated to accommodate 30,000 residents.

According to sporting organization 'SportAccord', the city has a Silver class partnership with the convention, enabling Edmonton to host many world classed events awarded during the Mandel administration. The city is one of six host cities of the 2015 FIFA Women's World Cup.

Edmonton Downtown arena
Edmonton Oilers CEO Daryl Katz has entered into an agreement with the city of Edmonton to joint finance the construction of a new arena for the hockey team which the city will own. The entertainment complex, arena and plaza along with neighbourhood development, and adjacent Winter Garden LRT Station costing $35M has an estimated budget of $601 Million CAD. The project will be financed between the city with a seed fund valued at $219M CAD. Katz Group will contribute $143M and invest in the neighbouring land development. The Albertan government won't fund the arena as Mandel anticipated however the provincial government inadvertently funded $170M through the Municipal Sustainability Initiative. $125M will be raised through ticket surcharges.
 Before construction could commence, Mandel was challenged with securing an additional outstanding $117M to guarantee the financing loans, as the Government of Alberta would not fund the arena.

Social and Business initiatives
Responding to an upsurge of domestic spousal violence in 2006, Mandel together with the Alberta Council for Women's Shelters hosted the first 'Breakfast with guys' peace seminar aimed at curbing violence. The event inspired Edmonton's business leaders raise awareness and support among their staff and community. This initiative has since been replicated  globally.

To address the needs of Edmonton's Aboriginal community the city conducted the 'Edmonton Urban Aboriginal Accord Initiative Project', many important documents and agreements with Treaty 6 natives, 'as an accord between Edmonton and the Aboriginal community' were written.

In 2011 Mandel commissioned the 'Community Sustainability Task Force', to address problems that mature Edmontonian neighborhoods faced. The organization reported on recommendations through the 'ELEVATE' report.

Mandel negotiated with the county of Leduc to amalgamate, 15,600 Acres of land to be used to support Edmonton's anticipated growth, if approved it will be the first major growth since 1982.

IBM granted 400,000 USD worth of expertise and advice to assist local experts in improving the lives of Edmontonians through the effective use of data and technology, listing the city as a 2011 Smart Cities Challenge winner.

In 2012, Mandel embarked on a trade mission to meet business and municipal leaders from Asia, to assert Edmonton's place in global Energy and business trade.

Events during Mayoralty
In 2013, city council approved to support the UofA as home of the Canadian Women's Basketball team, the city will grant 500,000 CAD over 4 years to develop the sport such as introducing youth to the game.

The city of Edmonton and the aboriginals Treaty 6 commenced on a dialog to address the needs of Aboriginal Edmontonians. In 2005 the two parties signed with the Edmonton Urban Aboriginal Accord.

Mandel started the first Mayor Pride Brunch, in 2005. The event is a fund raiser to raise money for gay pride youth Camp fYrefly. Mandel proclaimed a week in April 2013 as Transgender Awareness week to bring awareness of the challenges Transgender Edmontonians face such as violence.

In 2006–2011 the city administration has been criticized by some members of the local press on issues relating to infrastructure maintenance.

In September 2007, Mandel ordered the removal from city property of work by Edmonton sculptor Ryan McCourt, after receiving a 700-name petition that alleged McCourt's sculptures had "hurt Hindu religious sensibilities".

Mandel created the Mayor's Evening for the Arts held at the Francis Winspear Centre, out of formerly a luncheon event to an annual festive evening gala. The event showcases the talents of Edmontonian performing artists in a grand spectacle and awards ceremony. In 2012, he celebrated the 25th Anniversary of this tradition. In 2013, Mandel created the 'Ambassador of the Arts Award' awarded at the gala. Honouring significant contributions by individuals or corporations who represented Edmonton artistically on the international or national stage.

Mandel proclaimed the Edmonton Public Library's centennial anniversary to be 'Edmonton Public Library Day' issuing free library membership.

City Charter
To address the challenges of evolving into metropolises, Mandel, together with Calgary Mayor Naheed Nenshi, negotiated a memorandum of understanding with the Alberta government. This motion will enable both mayors to work with the Alberta government to draft city charters in 2013, effectively articulating the powers and responsibilities the municipalities have to deal with unique issues of development such as taxation.

Provincial Politics
Mandel was named as Minister of Health by Alberta premier Jim Prentice in the fall of 2014. Two months later, he would win the seat vacated by Dave Hancock (Edmonton-Whitemud) in a by-election. He went on to serve as health minister and MLA until the defeat of the Progressive Conservatives, and the loss of his own seat to NDP candidate Bob Turner, in the 2015 election.

Mandel announced his candidacy for the leadership of the Alberta Party on January 10, 2018, and was elected Leader of the Alberta Party on February 27, 2018, with 66% of the vote, succeeding Greg Clark. He secured the Alberta Party’s nomination to be the candidate in Edmonton-McClung on May 12, 2018.

On February 8, 2019 Mandel's name was added to an Elections Alberta list of politicians deemed Ineligible to run as candidates or serve as Chief Financial Officers in provincial elections. He was given a five year ban for having missed a deadline for filing a financial campaign return for his 2018 nomination campaign. The Elections Alberta deputy chief electoral officer stated that candidates have four months from the time they are nominated to file financial campaign returns. Mandel stated that "there is confusion about the actual due dates this paperwork is due to Elections Alberta. Because the penalties for late filing are so serious, we have also applied to the Court of Queen’s Bench to review and rule on this matter as soon as possible" and "we believe we have filed within the required deadline". On March 4, 2019, the 5 year ban was lifted after the Court of Queen's Bench ruled that a 5 year ban was an inappropriate penalty for a missed deadline, in this case.

Electoral Results

2004 Edmonton municipal election

2007 Edmonton municipal election

2010 Edmonton municipal election

Edmonton-Whitemud by-election, 2014

2015 Alberta general election

2018 Alberta Party leadership election

2019 general election

References

External links
 City of Edmonton biography
 CityMayors profile

1945 births
Businesspeople from Edmonton
Businesspeople from Ontario
Living people
Mayors of Edmonton
Miami University alumni
Politicians from Windsor, Ontario
University of Windsor alumni
Members of the Executive Council of Alberta
Progressive Conservative Association of Alberta MLAs
Leaders of the Alberta Party
Lincoln College (Illinois) alumni
Jewish mayors of places in Canada
Health ministers of Alberta
21st-century Canadian politicians
Alberta Party candidates in Alberta provincial elections